Pete Krebs is an American musician from Portland, Oregon, best known as a member of the punk-pop band Hazel, and for No Confidence Man, a split record with Elliott Smith.

Career
Krebs was a member of punk bands Hair Bed Peace, Thrillhammer and Hazel, bluegrass band Golden Delicious, gypsy swing band Pearl Django and later recorded solo as a singer-songwriter.

Krebs debuted as a solo musician in 1995 on Cavity Search Records with the acoustic Brigadier.

In 1997, Krebs released Western Electric.

Sweet Ona Rose, released in 1999, included former Soundgarden member Ben Shepherd on bass.

Krebs collaborated with other Portland Gypsy-jazz enthusiasts on the album Hot Ginger and Dynamite in 2001. He also teamed up with Bad Livers singer and banjo virtuoso Danny Barnes for Duet For Clarinet and Goat (Cavity Search) in which the musicians covered each other's songs.

Krebs' I Know It By Heart  was released on Cavity Search in 2003.

Krebs played with The Stolen Sweets from 2004-2014. The Sweets play music modeled after that of the Boswell Sisters, a 1930s group.

Krebs was inducted into the Oregon Music Hall of Fame in 2013 along with his band mates from Hazel. Krebs also fronts the western swing outfit Pete Krebs & the Portland Playboys.

References

Living people
Year of birth missing (living people)
Musicians from Oregon